Magninia tonkinea is a species of beetle in the family Cerambycidae, and the only species in the genus Magninia. It was described by Clermont in 1932.

References

Lamiini
Beetles described in 1932